Stella Dupont (born 3 November 1973) is a French politician who has represented the 2nd constituency of the Maine-et-Loire department in the National Assembly since 2017. She is a member of La République En Marche! (LREM).

Political career
In Parliament, Dupont serves on the Finance Committee.

Since 2020, Dupont has been serving – alongside Béatrice Piron – as one of two treasurers of the LREM parliamentary group under chairman Christophe Castaner.

Political positions

Domestic policy
On immigration, Dupont is considered to be part of her parliamentary group's more liberal wing. In late 2019, she was among the critics of the government's legislative proposals on immigrations and instead joined 17 LREM members who recommended, in particular, greater access to the labour market for migrants, but also "specific measures for collaboration with the authorities of safe countries, such as Albania and Georgia, in order to inform candidates for departure, in their country of origin, of what the asylum application really is."

In 2020, Dupont was one of ten LREM members who voted against her parliamentary group's majority and opposed a much discussed security bill drafted by her colleagues Alice Thourot and Jean-Michel Fauvergue that helps, among other measures, curtail the filming of police forces.

Foreign policy
In July 2019, Dupont decided not to align with her parliamentary group's majority and became one of 52 LREM members who abstained from a vote on the French ratification of the European Union’s Comprehensive Economic and Trade Agreement (CETA) with Canada.

See also
 2017 French legislative election

References

1973 births
Living people
Deputies of the 15th National Assembly of the French Fifth Republic
La République En Marche! politicians
21st-century French women politicians
Place of birth missing (living people)
Women members of the National Assembly (France)
Deputies of the 16th National Assembly of the French Fifth Republic